Vasyutin or Vasyutsin is a Russian surname. Notable people with the surname include:

 Aleksandr Vasyutin (born 1995), Russian footballer
 Sergei Vasyutin (born 1957), Russian football manager
 Vladimir Vasyutin (1952–2002), Russian cosmonaut
 Yury Vasyutsin (born 1978), Belarusian footballer

Russian-language surnames